Jungle Raiders is a 1945 Columbia film serial. Kane Richmond plays the hero Bob Moore, with Janet Reed as Ann Shaw (his love interest), and Charles King plays head villain Jake Raynes.

Plot
Ann Reed travels to a mysterious land following her father, Dr. Murray Reed, who disappeared into its interior many years ago. Ann falls in with Bob Moore and Joe Riley who have just been mustered out of the military and plan to join Moore's father who is researching rumors of a miracle healing drug used by the witch doctors of a mysterious tribe. The owner of the local trading post is determine to keep the scientists out of the area so he can locate a cache of jewels guarded by the tribe without outside interference...

Cast
 Kane Richmond as Bob Moore
 Eddie Quillan as Joe Riley, Bob Moore's comedy sidekick
 Veda Ann Borg as Cora Bell
 Carol Hughes as Zara, the High Priestess
 Janet Shaw as Ann Reed
 John Elliott as Dr Horace Moore
 Jack Ingram as Tom Hammil
 Charles King as Jake Raynes, owner of the trading post
 Ernie Adams as Charley, a henchman
 I. Stanford Jolley as Brent, a henchman
 Kermit Maynard as Cragg, a henchman
 Budd Buster as Dr Murray Reed, abductee and Ann Reed's father
 Nick Thompson as the chief of the Arzecs
 Alfredo DeSa as Matu

Production

Stunts
 George Magrill
 Kermit Maynard
 Eddie Parker
 Wally West

Chapter titles
 Mystery of the Lost Tribe
 Primitive Sacrifice
 Prisoners of Fate
 Valley of Destruction
 Perilous Mission
 Into the Valley of Fire
 Devil's Brew
 The Dagger Pit
 Jungle Jeopardy
 Prisoners of Peril
 Vengeance of Zara
 The Key to Arzec
 Witch Doctor's Treachery
 The Judgment of Rana
 The Jewels of Arzec
Source:

See also
List of film serials by year
List of film serials by studio

References

External links
 
 

1945 films
1940s English-language films
American black-and-white films
1945 adventure films
Columbia Pictures film serials
Films directed by Lesley Selander
American adventure films
Films with screenplays by George H. Plympton
1940s American films